The Power and The Glory is a 2023 studio album from American rock band The Bad Ends. This debut release from the band has received positive critical reception.

Recording and release
The project began when Bill Berry's former band R.E.M. toured with Five Eight, featuring Mike Mantione. The two met up occasionally over several years and eventually Mantione sent Berry demos of work that he intended for a solo album that led to the formation of the Bad Ends; Mantione had already recruited several other local musicians, but they lacked a drummer to give the songs cohesion. Leading up the album, the group released the single "All Your Friends Are Dying" and performed a hometown show on November 27, 2022. Their debut represents the first album that Berry had worked on in over 20 years. A music video for "Mile Marker 29" debuted on The Late Show with Stephen Colbert on March 24, 2023.

Reception
 The editorial staff of AllMusic Guide scored this album four out of five stars, with reviewer Stephen Thomas Erlewine  praising the mature and introspective lyrics written by vocalist Mike Mantione with drummer Bill Berry's energetic approach. For American Songwriter, Lee Zimmerman notes the diversity of the musicianship on display and sums up his review that this album "bodes well for any future offerings that follow later on". Uncuts Stephen Deusner rated The Power and The Glory a nine out of 10 for "inventive" songs that explore aging and death with "immense compassion and concern".

Track listing
All songs written by Bill Berry, Dave Dominzi, Christian Lopez, Mike Mantione, and Geoff Melkonian, except where noted.
"Mile Marker 29" – 3:42
"All Your Friends Are Dying" (Berry, Dominzi, Lopez, Mantione, Melkonian, and Mike Rizzi) – 4:25
"Left to Be Found" – 4:56
"Thanksgiving 1915" – 3:21
"Ode to Jose" – 3:15
"The Ballad of Satan’s Bride" – 4:34
"Little Black Cloud" – 4:37
"Honestly" – 3:29
"New York Murder Suicide" – 4:02

Personnel
The Bad Ends
Bill Berry – drums, percussion, guitars, electric sitar, whistling, string arrangement for “Ode to Jose”, mixing, production
Dave Domizi – bass guitar, backing vocals, cello, piano, mixing, production
Christian Lopez – guitars, mandolin, banjo, mixing, production
Mike Mantione – vocals, guitars, mixing, production
Geoff Melkonian – keyboards, piano, backing vocals, guitars, violin, viola, glockenspiel, accordion, mixing, production

Additional musicians
Mike Albanese – modular synth, recording, mixing production
Sean Dunn – guitar on “New York Murder Suicide”
Gladys – photography
Joel Hatstat – mastering at High Jump Media, Athens, Georgia, United States
John Neff – pedal steel guitar on “Ode to Jose” and “Little Black Cloud”
Jeremy Ray – album art and layout

See also
List of 2023 albums

References

External links

Aggregate reviews from Album of the Year
Review from Ticketmaster

2023 debut albums
New West Records albums
The Bad Ends albums